Monaco competed at the 1994 Winter Olympics in Lillehammer, Norway.

Among the country's athletes was Prince Albert, in the bobsled event.

Competitors
The following is the list of number of competitors in the Games.

Alpine skiing

Men

Bobsleigh

References

Official Olympic Reports
 Olympic Winter Games 1994, full results by sports-reference.com

Nations at the 1994 Winter Olympics
1994 Winter Olympics
Olym